Seth Meribre was the twenty-fourth pharaoh of the 13th Dynasty during the Second Intermediate Period. Seth Meribre reigned from Memphis, ending in 1749 BC or c. 1700 BC. The length of his reign is not known for certain; the Egyptologist Kim Ryholt proposes that he reigned for a short time, certainly less than ten years.

Attestations 
Seth Meribre is only attested for certain on the Turin canon, column 7, line 23 (Alan Gardiner and Jürgen von Beckerath: col. 6 row 23). Ryholt suggests that stele JE35256, discovered in Abydos and now in the Egyptian Museum, was originally inscribed with the nomen, prenomen and Horus name of Seth Meribre. The stele, bearing a date year 4, was later usurped by Neferhotep I. Previously, historian Anthony Leahy has argued that the stele was erected by Wegaf rather than Seth Meribre, an opinion shared by Darrell Baker. At the opposite end, the site of Medamud, northeast of Luxor has yielded many ruined structures and architectural remains which were probably erected by Seth Meribre but were subsequently usurped by his successor Sobekhotep III. In particular, a lintel from Medamud and now in the Egyptian Museum, JE 44944, bears almost-erased signs corresponding to Seth Meribre's nomen.

Jürgen von Beckerath believes that Seth Meribre can be identified with a king mentioned on Genealogy of Ankhefensekhmet of the much later 22nd Dynasty. This king bears the name "Aaqen", literally  The donkey is strong. Von Beckerath proposes that this refers to Seth Meribre and that the name originally was "Sethqen", that is, Seth is strong. Indeed, since the god Seth had been ostracized during the 22nd Dynasty, the hieroglyph of the Seth-animal had been replaced by the hieroglyph of the donkey, yielding "Aaqen".

Chronological position and reign length
The Egyptologists Darrell Baker and Kim Ryholt place Seth Meribre as the twenty-fourth ruler of the 13th Dynasty, while Jürgen von Beckerath sees him as the twentieth king. These authors agree, however, that Seth Meribre probably usurped the throne at the expense of his predecessor, Sehetepkare Intef.

The duration of Seth Meribre's reign is lost in a lacuna of the Turin canon, except for the end "... [and] 6 days". Kim Ryholt gives a total of 10 years for the combined reigns of Imyremeshaw, Sehetepkare Intef and Seth Meribre. Furthermore, following Papyrus Boulaq 18, there are reasons to believe that either Imyremeshaw or Sehetepkare Intef reigned for over five years, thus leaving less than 5 years to Seth Meribre.

References

18th-century BC Pharaohs
Pharaohs of the Thirteenth Dynasty of Egypt